Øye may refer to the following locations:

 Øye, Innlandet, a village in Vang municipality, Innlandet county, Norway
 Øye Stave Church, a church in Vang municipality, Innlandet county, Norway
 Øye, Rogaland, a village in Hjelmeland municipality, Rogaland county, Norway

See also 
 Oye (disambiguation)